This is a list of the Australian moth species of the family Hypertrophidae. It also acts as an index to the species articles and forms part of the full List of moths of Australia.

Acraephnes cryeropis (Turner, 1947)
Acraephnes innubila (Turner, 1927)
Acraephnes inscripta (Turner, 1947)
Acraephnes litodes (Turner, 1947)
Acraephnes nitida Turner, 1947
Acraephnes nivea Turner, 1947
Acraephnes sulfurata (Meyrick, 1907)
Allotropha percussana (Walker, 1864)
Callizyga dispar Turner, 1894
Eomystis rhodopis Meyrick, 1888
Epithetica typhoscia Turner, 1923
Eupselia anommata Turner, 1898
Eupselia aristonica Meyrick, 1880
Eupselia axiepaena Turner, 1947
Eupselia beatella (Walker, 1864)
Eupselia beltera Turner, 1947
Eupselia callidyas Meyrick, 1915
Eupselia carpocapsella (Walker, 1864)
Eupselia holoxantha Lower, 1894
Eupselia hypsichora Meyrick, 1906
Eupselia iridizona Lower, 1899
Eupselia leucaspis Meyrick, 1906
Eupselia melanostrepta Meyrick, 1880
Eupselia philomorpha Lower, 1901
Eupselia satrapella Meyrick, 1880
Eupselia syncapna Meyrick, 1920
Eupselia theorella Meyrick, 1880
Eupselia tristephana Meyrick, 1915
Hypertropha chlaenota Meyrick, 1887
Hypertropha desumptana (Walker, 1863)
Hypertropha thesaurella Meyrick, 1882
Hypertropha tortriciformis (Guenée, 1852)
Oxytropha ametalla (Turner, 1898)
Peritropha oligodrachma Diakonoff, 1954
Progonica rhothias (Meyrick, 1906)
Thudaca calliphrontis Meyrick, 1892
Thudaca campylota Meyrick, 1892
Thudaca circumdatella (Walker, 1864)
Thudaca crypsidesma Meyrick, 1893
Thudaca cymatistis Meyrick, 1893
Thudaca haplonota Meyrick, 1892
Thudaca heterastis Meyrick, 1892
Thudaca mimodora Meyrick, 1892
Thudaca monolechria Turner, 1947
Thudaca obliquella Walker, 1864
Thudaca ophiosema Meyrick, 1892
Thudaca orthodroma Meyrick, 1892
Thudaca stadiaula Meyrick, 1892
Thudaca trabeata Meyrick, 1892

External links 
Hypertrophidae at Australian Faunal Directory
Hypertrophidae at lepidoptera.butterflyhouse

Australia